The Rt. Rev. George de la Poer Beresford   (19 July 1765 – 16 October 1841) was an Irish bishop.

A member of the Beresford family headed by the Marquess of Waterford, Beresford was the son of the Hon. John Beresford, younger son of Marcus Beresford, 1st Earl of Tyrone. Marcus Beresford and John Claudius Beresford were his brothers.

Beresford was Dean of Kilmore from 1797 to 1801, Bishop of Clonfert and Kilmacduagh between 1801 and 1802 and Bishop of Kilmore between 1802 and 1839. The latter year the Kilmore and Ardagh sees were united, and Beresford served as Bishop for the new see until his death two years later.

Beresford married Frances, daughter of Gervase Parker Bushe, daughter of Gervase Parker Bushe and Mary Grattan (sister of Henry Grattan), in 1794. They had several children, including Marcus Beresford, Archbishop of Armagh. Beresford died in October 1841, aged 76. His wife survived him by two years and died in May 1843. His daughter Charlotte married into the Lumley family and was the mother of the ninth earl of Scarbrough.

References

1765 births
1841 deaths
George
Anglican bishops of Kilmore
Bishops of Kilmore and Ardagh
Bishops of Clonfert and Kilmacduagh
Deans of Kilmore